The Virginia Oaks is an American Thoroughbred horse race that since 2019 has been run at Colonial Downs in New Kent County, Virginia. It was previously known as the Commonwealth Oaks when it was held at Laurel Park in Maryland. It is open to three-year-old fillies who are willing to run  miles on the turf.

The race was not run in 2014. It is a Listed Stakes event as of 2019. On April 19, 2018, The Virginia Racing Commission announced that the race would not be held that year.

Records
Speed  record:
 1:46.57 - My Impression (2016)

Most wins by an owner:
 2 - William M. Backer (2004, 2009)
 2 - Stuart S. Janney III (2015, 2016) 

Most wins by a jockey:
 3 - Forest Boyce (2013, 2015, 2019)

Most wins by a trainer:
 2 - Hamilton A. Smith (2004, 2009)
 2 - Claude R. McGaughey III (2015, 2016)

Winners of the Virginia Oaks

References

Graded stakes races in the United States
Turf races in the United States
Flat horse races for three-year-old fillies
Recurring sporting events established in 2004
Horse races in Maryland
2004 establishments in Maryland